Monteith or Menteith may refer to:

People
Alex Monteith (born 1977), new media artist 
Alexander C. Monteith (1902–1979), senior vice-president of the Westinghouse Electric Corporation
 Andrew Monteith (1823–1896), Canadian businessman and politician
John C. Monteith (1853–1940), Canadian politician and son of Andrew
 Joseph Monteith (1865–1934), Canadian politician and son of Andrew
 Jay Waldo Monteith (1903–1981), Canadian politician and son of Joseph
 Robert Monteith (1812-1884) DL, JP, Scottish politician and philanthropist 
 Joseph Monteith (Deputy Lieutenant) (1852-1911) DL, JP, son of Robert Monteith of Carstairs
 Brian Monteith (born 1958), former Scottish politician
 Cory Monteith (1982–2013), Canadian actor
 Dermott Monteith (1943–2009), Irish cricketer
 Hazel Monteith (1917-2012), Jamaican Senator, social worker and radio personality
 Henry Ruthven Monteith (1848-1922), American professor at the University of Connecticut
 Jimmie W. Monteith (1917–1944), United States Army officer awarded the Medal of Honor
 John Monteith (born 1929), Scottish Royal Society fellow
 John Monteith (minister), founder of University of Michigan
 Kelly Monteith (1943-2023), American comedian
 Ken Monteith (born 1938), former Canadian politician
 Larry K. Monteith (born 1933), American electrical engineer and academic leader
 Ray Monteith (born 1920), Canadian politician
 William Monteith (1790–1864), British soldier and historian
 Monteith and Rand, 1979 comedy team

Places

Australia 

 Monteith, Glebe, a heritage-listed house in Sydney, New South Wales
 Monteith, South Australia

Canada 

 McMurrich/Monteith, Ontario, a Canadian municipality
 Monteith, community in Iroquois Falls, Ontario
 Monteith Correctional Complex, a medium-security prison in Monteith

United Kingdom 

Menteith or Monteith, a district of south Perthshire, Scotland
Carstairs House or Monteith House, a country house in South Lanarkshire
Lake of Menteith, Scotland
Monteith, County Down, a village in Northern Ireland

Other uses
 Camp Monteith, Kosovo military base
 Monteith Hall (disambiguation), multiple places
 Monteith's, a brand of beer, brewed in Greymouth, New Zealand on the west coast of the South Island

See also
 Thomas and Walter Monteith House, built by the founders of Albany, Oregon